Jiří Mlika (born 18 July 1980) is a former Czech professional football player who currently plays for FK Baník Sokolov.

References

Czech footballers
1980 births
Living people
Czech First League players
1. FK Příbram players
FK Baník Sokolov players
FC Viktoria Plzeň players
Regionalliga players
Association football midfielders
People from Kutná Hora
Sportspeople from the Central Bohemian Region